Rifts World Book Nine: South America 2 is a 1995 role-playing game supplement for Rifts published by Palladium Books.

Contents
Rifts: South America 2 covers a broad variety of different regions and factions in South America.

Reception
Lucya Szachnowski reviewed Rifts: South America 2 for Arcane magazine, rating it a 6 out of 10 overall. Szachnowski comments that "New material - such as Nazcan line magic - is highly useable and straightforward. If you are used to Rifts or other Palladium systems, you shouldn't have much trouble with this. However, this isn't a book to buy as your first Rifts supplement because it constantly refers to other Palladium games."

Reviews
Dragon #229 (May, 1996)

References

Rifts (role-playing game)
Role-playing game books
Role-playing game supplements introduced in 1995